Charles "Bud" Sims is an American football coach.  He currently serves as the tackles and tight ends coach at St. John Fisher College. Sims was the head football coach at The College at Brockport, State University of New York in Brockport, New York from 1976 to 1982, where he completed a record of 28–35–2.

from 1970 to 1974, Sims was the defensive coordinator at the Rochester Institute of Technology, where he worked under head coach Tom Coughlin.

Head coaching record

References

External links
 St. John Fisher profile

Year of birth missing (living people)
Living people
Brockport Golden Eagles football coaches
RIT Tigers football coaches
Place of birth missing (living people)
St. John Fisher Cardinals football coaches
High school football coaches in New York (state)